The Brockton Symphony Orchestra (BrSO) is a community orchestra based in Brockton, Massachusetts founded in 1948 as the Brockton Orchestral Society.  Described by the Boston Globe as "one of the region's classical jewels", the orchestra performs five or six concerts each year, including its annual Holiday Pops Concert and Chamber Music Concert at local venues in Brockton including the West Middle School Auditorium and the Oliver Ames High School. In the 1970s, the orchestra also produced original operas and ballets. Contemporary works which have been commissioned and premiered by the orchestra include Gardner Read's Vernal Equinox (1955), Beth Denisch's Golden Fanfare (1998), and Thomas Oboe Lee's Sounds of The Islands (2005).

The organization consists of the Chairperson of the Executive Board is Susan Caplan, conductor Emilian Badea, who holds a DMA from Boston University and has been a bassoonist with the orchestra since 1989; and concertmistress Kristina Nilsson, co-founder of Boston's Pro Arte Chamber Orchestra. Clarinetist and conductor Jonathan Cohler served as the orchestra's Musical Director from 1996 to 2006, and James Orent served as Music Director from 2007 until his death in 2021.

Vasconcellos Youth Competition
The Brockton Symphony Orchestra also hosts the annual Vasconcellos Youth Competition, offering $1500 in prizes every year to instrumentalists under the age of 18. Winners are invited to play a concerto with the Brockton Symphony Orchestra. Past Winners include Miki Nagahara, Winston Huang, Jaclyn Freshman, Kristhyan Benitez, and Meihui An.

References

External links

Orchestras based in Massachusetts
Brockton, Massachusetts
Musical groups established in 1948